Gladiators: The Ashes 1 was the first Ashes series for Australian Gladiators and UK Gladiators.

Contenders

Gladiators

Episodes

References

Gladiators (franchise)